Matthew Lee James (born 22 July 1991) is an English professional footballer who plays for Championship club Bristol City. His regular position is in midfield, but he can play in defence when required. James began his career with Manchester United, where his brother Reece also came through the youth ranks, but left the club for a spell on loan at Preston North End before joining Leicester City on a permanent basis in 2012.

Club career

Manchester United
Born in Bacup, Lancashire, James joined the Manchester United Academy at an early age, and made his first appearance for the under-18 side in October 2005, at the age of 14. His next appearance for the under-18s came just over a year later, when he came on as a substitute for Magnus Eikrem in a Premier Academy League fixture against Manchester City. He made a further eight appearances for the under-18s during the 2006–07 season, before establishing himself as a regular in the team in 2007–08, although he began the season filling in in defence. James scored his first goals in a Manchester United shirt during the 2007–08 season, both of them in the league. After making his first appearance for the reserve team in November 2007, James became a regular for the reserves during the 2008–09 season, while remaining a relative mainstay in the under-18 side. At the end of a season in which he had made 22 appearances for the reserves and 14 for the under-18s, James received his first call-up to the Manchester United senior team on 24 May 2009. Given the number 47 jersey, James was named on the bench for the match, but did not take to the field.

James signed his first professional contract with Manchester United in July 2009, before playing in the 1–0 win over Bolton Wanderers in the final of the 2008–09 Lancashire Senior Cup. Prior to the first team's match against Barnsley in the Fourth Round of the League Cup on 27 October 2009, James was given a new squad number (43), and was named as an unused substitute.

Preston North End (loan)
In February 2010, James followed in the footsteps of Manchester United teammate Danny Welbeck by signing on loan with Preston North End until the end of the 2009–10 season. He went straight into the Preston first-team for their match against Sheffield United on 9 February 2010, and scored within 10 minutes as his deflected shot from outside the penalty area beat Sheffield United goalkeeper Ian Bennett. James returned to Manchester United at the end of the 2009–10 season, but rejoined Preston on a season-long loan on 2 July 2010.

On 30 December 2010, Sir Alex Ferguson chose to recall Ritchie De Laet, Joshua King and James from their loans at Preston after the sacking of his son. De Laet and King returned immediately, but due to the terms of James' loan, he did not return to Manchester United until 4 January 2011.

Leicester City

2012–13 season
On 15 May 2012, James and De Laet moved to Leicester City in a double transfer, for which the fee was undisclosed. The pair each signed three-year contracts. James, along with De Laet and Jamie Vardy, made his competitive debut for Leicester against Torquay United, scoring his first goal for the club (and Leicester's third of the night) as the Foxes ran out 4–0 winners in the League Cup tie. James added another 3 goals (all in the league) over the course of the season, including one in the 3–2 win against Nottingham Forest on the final day of the season, helping Leicester to the final play-off position. James started both legs of the eventual 3–2 aggregate defeat to Watford in the Championship play-off semi-final.

2013–14 season
James found himself starting more games during the 2013–14 season, being in the line-up for Leicester's first five league games before being controversially shown the first red card of his career in the 1–2 defeat to Charlton Athletic, after being shown two yellow cards. On 8 February 2014, James scored his only goal of the season, helping Leicester come from 2–0 down to draw 2–2 with Watford. James played 35 times in the league as Leicester won promotion to the Premier League, collecting the Championship trophy along the way.

2014–15 season
Having missed the start of the season through injury, James made his first Premier League appearance on 21 September 2014, as a second-half substitute in a 5–3 victory against his former club, Manchester United. On 10 January 2015, James picked up the second red card of his career in the 1–0 victory over Aston Villa, he was given a straight red following a strong challenge on Jores Okore and an ensuing altercation with Ciaran Clark that resulted in Clark receiving a second yellow card himself. In a 2–0 win over Southampton on 9 May, James ruptured his anterior ligaments and was ruled out for between six and nine months.

2015–16 season
Due to his injury, James missed the entire 2015–16 campaign, in which the club became the Premier League champions.

2016–17 season
At the beginning of the season, James played with Leicester City U23 squad to regain fitness. On 26 November 2016, James returned to the first-team squad against Middlesbrough.

On 25 January 2017, he joined Barnsley on a loan deal until the summer of 2017.

2017–18 season
On 19 August 2017, James made his first start for the club since May 2015 in a 2–0 win over Brighton & Hove Albion.

2020–21 season
On 16 October 2020 he returned to Barnsley on loan.

On 6 January 2021, James joined Championship side Coventry City on loan. He scored his first goal for Coventry on 27 February 2021 in a 1-1 draw against Blackburn Rovers. On 21 May 2021 Leicester announced his departure from the club.

Bristol City
On 23 June 2021, James joined Championship club Bristol City on a three-year deal.

International career
James has played regularly for the England Under-16s and Under-17s sides, and in 2009 he was called up to the Under-19s for the 2009 UEFA European Under-19 Championship. He was named captain and in his first game as skipper, England recorded a 3–2 victory in their opening game against Austria.

Personal life
James' father, Linton James, played non-league football for Bacup Borough and later worked as assistant manager of the club. His younger brother, Reece James, currently plays for Blackpool in the EFL Championship. He was educated at Fearns Community Sports College.

He donated two therapy tilt-in space chairs, worth about £2000, to Fairfield General Hospital where his mother Maxine works as a nurse, in 2020.

Career statistics

Honours
Leicester City
Football League Championship: 2013–14

Individual
Leicester City Young Player of the Season: 2013–14

References

External links

Profile at ManUtd.com

1991 births
Living people
People from Bacup
English footballers
England youth international footballers
Association football defenders
Association football midfielders
Association football utility players
Manchester United F.C. players
Preston North End F.C. players
Leicester City F.C. players
Coventry City F.C. players
Barnsley F.C. players
Bristol City F.C. players
English Football League players
Premier League players